Autostrada A60 Tangenziale di Varese is an autostrada, tangent to the suburban area of Varese in the south. It is managed by Autostrada Pedemontana Lombarda S.p.A.

References

Buildings and structures completed in 2015
2015 establishments in Italy
A60
Transport in Lombardy